Human rights in Nicaragua refer to personable, political and social rights granted to every human in Nicaragua. Nicaragua derives its understanding of human rights from the Constitution of Nicaragua and international law. Nicaragua is a member state of the United Nations which states that fundamental human rights, such as freedom from slavery and freedom of expression, are enabled for all human beings without discrimination.

In 2019, anti-government protests spread across the country in response to the Sandinista National Liberation Front (In Spanish Frente Sandinista de Liberación Nacional FSLN) government's reforms of the country's social security system. This sparked a response from parapolicial groups, the National Police, and monitoring and control groups. Reports state that 328 protesters were killed in the backlash (as of 20 Sep 2019). This brought international attention to enactment of human rights within the country with organisations such as the United Nations and Organization of American States determining the events to be violations of the Universal Declaration of Human Rights.


Nicaraguan Constitution mentions of human rights 

The Constitution of Nicaragua was promulgated in 1987 with the latest amendments made in 2014. It was created to determine a democratic system of order to the government. Listed below are the sections of the Nicaraguan Constitution which highlight the laws and principles of human rights within the country.

Title I: Fundamental Principle 
Article 5 states that Nicaragua values include the recognition and protection of the indigenous people and those of African descent; all political views may be expressed freely; people with disabilities are to be treated equally and without discrimination; socialist ideals determine that the common good is more important than individual benefit, and opposes exploitation among human beings; all people are valued equally in a system which will benefit the most impoverished, disadvantaged and marginalized people; the Nicaraguan people will experience unity through equality; and all people have the right to own property without discrimination.

Title IV: Rights, Duties and Guarantees of the Nicaraguan People

Chapter I: Individual Rights 
This chapter determines the Nicaraguan people's rights to life; rights to privacy; rights to protect one's reputation; rights to protection from the State; rights to information; freedom of expression; freedom of religion; rights to a fair, speedy and public trial with the presumption of innocence and rights to counsel; freedom of movement; protection from false imprisonment; prohibition of corporal punishment, cruel treatment and torture; prohibition of slavery.

Article 27 states that all people within its territory, or subject to its jurisdiction, are equal and have the right to equal protection regardless of gender, belief, social status, financial status, political party affiliation, parentage, nationality, origin, race, language, or religion.

Chapter II: Political Rights 
This chapter determines that all Nicaraguan people have the right to exercise political rights regardless of gender; rights to freedom of political association; rights of individual or collective petitions; and rights to form political parties.

Article 53 states that the State recognizes the right to peaceful gathering without prior permission.

Article 54 states that “the right to public assembly, demonstration and mobilization in conformity with the law is recognized”.

Chapter III: Social Rights 
This chapter determines the Nicaraguan peoples' rights to work; rights to culture; rights to health care; rights to live in a healthy environment and obligations to maintain this environment; rights to social security; rights to be protected against hunger; rights to decent, comfortable and safe housing; rights to rest and leisure; freedom of press; freedom of religion; and State support for the disabled.

Chapter IV: Rights of the Family 
This chapter states that all Nicaraguan people have the rights to found a family; rights to transfer property through family inheritance; rights to marry; rights of children; rights to the protection to the process of human reproduction; and State support for the elderly.

Article 71 states that the rights of children are determined by the International Convention on Rights of Children.

Chapter V: Labor Rights 
This chapter determines the Nicaraguan peoples' rights to work; rights to equal pay; rights to a safe work environment; rights to strike; rights to the development of skills; rights to choose an occupation; rights to join trade unions; limitations to work hours and the rights to rest and leisure; limitations on the employment of children, and their protection against economic and social exploitation.

Chapter VI: Rights of the Communities of the Atlantic Coast 
Article 89 states that the communities of the Atlantic Coast are recognized as Nicaraguan people and have the same rights and obligations. They have the rights to self-governance and administration of local affairs according to tradition, all within national unity.

This chapter determines that the communities of the Atlantic Coast have the rights to preservation of languages, art and culture, and the development of these forms; and protection from discrimination as Nicaraguan citizens.

Democracy Index Ranking 

The Democracy Index ranking was started by the Economist Intelligence Unit (EIU) in 2006. It determines the state of democracy of 167 countries worldwide and categorizes them into the following categories according to their score: full democracy, flawed democracy, hybrid regime, authoritarian regime. Nicaragua was ranked 122nd out of 167 in 2019. The score of 3.55 categorizes the country as an authoritarian regime. This has dropped from Nicaragua's highest score of 6.07, and categorization of a flawed democracy, in 2008.

Perspectives on human rights

Organisations and their concerns 
In 2019, organizations including the United Nations and the Organization of American States highlighted "human rights violations" occurring in the country at the time.

Office of the United Nations High Commissioner for Human Rights 
The Report of the United Nations High Commissioner for Human Rights made on the Situation of human rights in Nicaragua was published by the office in 2019 (03 Sep 2019). The main violations of human rights that the OHCHR is concerned with are the right of peaceful assembly, rights to freedom of expression and association, right to liberty, rights to freedom from torture and to humane conditions of detention, right to a fair trial, victims' right to a remedy and reparation, and the impact of the crisis on the enjoyment of economic, social and cultural rights.

According to the report, the National Police banned public demonstrations by any group starting from Sep 2018, and reverted to using excessive force against those who continued to protest. It also states that the violence shown by pro-government groups was supported by police officers.

Media workers, journalists and minority groups were continuously harassed and subject to attacks by pro-government forces. The police and other relevant authorities did not investigate these events, and made no effort to prevent them from reoccurring. Groups who demonstrated against the government were often detained and subject to torture, thus creating a violation of the human right of association.

Organization of American States 
The Report of the Organization of American States High-Level Commission on Nicaragua was released to the press on 19 Nov 2019. The report accuses the government of Nicaragua of denying their citizens human rights through the use of harassment and intimidation, violation of political rights, violation of the freedom of the press and expression, inhuman treatment and arbitrary detention, subordination of the state by the executive, and disruption of the Constitutional order.

The report states that the police are using intimidation tactics to silence and prevent people from speaking out about human rights violations. The National Assembly revoked political access of its citizens for criticizing the government.

The report states that the government is going against the Constitution by not guaranteeing the foundation of human rights assigned to the country's citizens within the document.

Human Rights Watch 
The World Report published by the organisation in 2019 highlights various human rights violations believed to have occurred in Nicaragua during the protests. They state that the government along with the National Police began the silencing of anti-government protesters through violent means, resulting in the deaths of 324 people (Sep 2019). They also cite that human rights defenders became the targets for death threats, freedom of expression was inhibited by the National Police through raids of media offices, employees were dismissed on the grounds of political discrimination, and those detained were denied their rights to legal defenders of their choice and subjected to closed trials. The report lists these acts as "egregious abuses against critics and opponents with complete impunity".

Amnesty USA 
Amnesty USA lists violence against women, freedom of expression violations, and the violation of designated sexual and reproductive rights as their main concerns for the country. Nicaragua made abortions illegal under all circumstances in 2006 and has not repealed this law despite two major attempts to do so in 2008 and 2014 under the belief that this law was unconstitutional. Amnesty USA is concerned about the correlation between this law being propagated and the increase in maternal deaths. The organisation also voices its concern over the political clash between the FSLN supporters and anti-government protesters, stating that the pro-government groups attacked protesters and were not apprehended for these demonstrations of violence. Protesters were threatened with acts of violence in order to silence their political views, and Amnesty reports that no culprits have been brought to justice under this government.

Media coverage 
News on the protests and human rights violations reached a range of news media channels and publications, including BBC News, The Guardian, and Al Jazeera. Many articles focused on Daniel Ortego's role in the protests and the backlash the protesters faced. The BBC, Guardian and Al Jazeera all confirmed the reports from the listed organisations and stated that the violence was being propagated by pro-government and vigilante groups.

Government responses 
Nicaragua's president, Daniel Ortega, stated that the violence in Nicaragua was caused by drug traffickers and political enemies, not by his administration. He stated that there had been a "campaign of lies... to try to hurt the image of Nicaragua and its government". He also denied that any peaceful protests had ever been attacked.

2021 election crackdown

In the months leading up to the 2021 Nicaraguan general election, President Ortega jailed seven potential challengers for the office of president. Ortega's government shut down all print newspapers in the country by blockading the supply of paper, and also raided the offices of the opposition newspaper La Prensa in August 2021.

On 7 November 2021, the CNN reported that the elections have been called "a parody," "a sham," and "the worst possible conditions" for a vote. Daniel Ortega’s government have been accused of blocking political participation of potential rivals and closely controlling the electoral process. Cases of misinformation and the manipulation of social networks have also emerged as another possible contaminant in the electoral process.

References 

 
Nicaragua